The 2021 National Amateur Cup was the 97th edition of the National Amateur Cup, a knockout cup competition open to amateur teams affiliated with the United States Adult Soccer Association (USASA). This is the third edition of the tournament to award its champion a spot in the U.S. Open Cup.

Lansdowne Yonkers FC won their second National Amateur Cup title, defeating Cal FC 2–1 in the final.

Format 
All four regions of the USASA will hold tournaments to crown champions, which would then qualify for the final tournament. Qualification for these regionals was determined individually. The final four teams then compete in a single location knockout tournament to determine a national champion, with an additional game in place to crown both third and fourth place.

Region I 
Eight associations in USASA Region I sent representatives to the tournament for the Fritz Marth Amateur Cup. Due to the 2020 tournament's cancelation, five associations elected to send both their 2020 and 2021 amateur cup champions increasing the field to 13 teams.

The final of the regional tournament took place on June 19 at the Ukrainian American Sports Center in North Wales, Pennsylvania.

Home teams listed on top of bracket

Bold = winner
* = after extra time, = penalty shootout score

Region II 
In total, 19 teams across eight states signed up to compete in the tournament for the Bill Davey Amateur Cup. The full bracket was revealed on April 2, with the First Round acting as "Play-in" games for the bracket proper.

The final of the regional tournament took place on June 26 at the SeatGeek Stadium Turf Fields in Bridgeview, Illinois.

First round

Bracket

Home teams listed on top of bracket

Bold = winner
* = after extra time, = penalty shootout score

Region III 
Applications for the Region III tournament closed on May 8. On June 9, the field of eight teams, representing five different states, was announced along with the tournament format. Unlike the other regions, Region III separated its entrants into two groups with each playing three games over two days. The highest finishing team from each group moved on to the Region III Amateur Cup Final on Sunday, June 13.

The regional tournament took place between June 11–13 at the Richard Siegel Soccer Complex in Murfreesboro, Tennessee.

Group A

Group B

Region III Final

Region IV 
Six teams from two states will compete for the Region IV amateur cup. Only two of the region's 20 member state associations (Colorado Soccer Association and Cal South) will have teams taking part in the tournament, with all five Colorado teams coming from the Colorado Super League.

The final of the regional tournament will take place on June 23 and will be hosted by Cal FC at Orange County Great Park in Irvine, California.

Home teams listed on top of bracket

Bold = winner
* = after extra time, = penalty shootout score

National Amateur Cup Finals 
The national finals were held between August 6 and 7 at the SeatGeek Stadium Turf Fields in Bridgeview, Illinois, a suburb of Chicago. Lansdowne Yonkers FC won the championship for a second time in five years by beating Cal FC, 2–1. As champion Lansdowne receives a spot in the 2022 U.S. Open Cup and $7,000. Cal receives $5,000 as runner-up while Springfield FC and Nashville United each receive $3,500 as semifinalists.

Notes

References 

National Amateur Cup
National Amateur Cup
2021